The Uprising is a 1912 silent short film drama directed by Romaine Fielding for the Lubin Manufacturing Company.

Cast
 Romaine Fielding - The Father
 Mary Ryan - Mary(*as Mary E. Ryan)
 Robyn Adair - Bob, Mary's Sweetheart

References

External links
  The Uprising at IMDb.com

1912 films
American silent short films
Lubin Manufacturing Company films
Lost American films
Films directed by Romaine Fielding
American black-and-white films
Silent American drama films
1912 drama films
1912 lost films
Lost drama films
1910s American films